AA Book may refer to:

Projects Review, or the AA Book, of the Architectural Association School of Architecture
The Big Book of Alcoholics Anonymous
Books published by The Automobile Association

See also
AA (disambiguation)